WEFS (channel 68) is an educational independent television station licensed to Cocoa, Florida, United States, serving the Orlando area. The station is owned by Eastern Florida State College (formerly Brevard Community College), and maintains studios at the EFSC campus in Cocoa; its transmitter is located near Bithlo, Florida.

History

Early years
WEFS began on June 18, 1987 as WRES on channel 18. The station's original slogan was "WRES, Your Educational Resource;" the call letters were derived from the word "resource." It was originally an educational independent station. In 1991, the station changed its call letters to WBCC and swapped channels with commercial WKCF, moving to channel 68.

PBS membership and digital conversion
On January 1, 2002, the station became a secondary PBS member station, showing some limited programming from the network. By that April, renovations began to accommodate WBCC-DT channel 30, which took to the air on November 4, 2003.

Partnerships with University of Central Florida, Brevard Public Schools, Florida Knowledge Network and The Florida Channel filled out the channel lineup.

Carriage of WUCF-TV
Prior to July 2011, WMFE-TV had been the flagship PBS station for central Florida. In fall 2010, WMFE's owner, Community Communications, announced that it had been forced to furlough several employees due to financial difficulties. On April 1, 2011, WMFE announced that it would sell channel 24 and leave PBS due to these financial difficulties and "critical uncertainties in federal and state funding".

When news spread of the sale, a campaign was undertaken by local residents and students at UCF to try to keep an active PBS station in the Orlando market. On May 26, 2011, the UCF Board of Trustees approved a partnership with BCC to create WUCF-TV, the new primary PBS station for Central Florida. The new station would lease WBCC's primary digital channel, and operate from WBCC's facilities. However, WBCC would retain its license and call letters. On June 2, PBS approved the creation of WUCF and announced that it would become Central Florida's primary PBS channel. The station served as the Orlando market's only PBS station, as WDSC-TV in Daytona Beach left PBS on July 1, concurrent with WMFE's departure from PBS and the launch of WUCF.

Resuming independence

On June 21, 2012, Community Communications announced that it would sell all of WMFE-TV's assets, except the studio facilities, to UCF. However, UCF will rent the studios from Community on an as-needed basis.

The purchase of WMFE's license by UCF and the subsequent approval of WUCF-TV's license by the FCC on August 15, 2012 led to the creation of WUCF as a separate entity. UCF dissolved its partnership with BCC on November 15, 2012, moving all operations of WUCF-TV to the stronger channel 24. At the same time, WBCC ended its PBS membership and is once again an educational independent station.

In July 2013, Brevard Community College changed its name to Eastern Florida State College in order to advertise the offering of new four-year degrees. As a result, on July 1, WBCC changed its call letters to WEFS.

Programming
WEFS-HD airs a mix of public and independent programming. WEFS-CL currently airs Classic Arts Showcase. WEFS-NS airs NASA TV's educational channel. WEFS-FL airs The Florida Channel.

Technical information

Subchannels
The station's digital signal is multiplexed:

Analog-to-digital conversion
WEFS (as WBCC) shut down its analog signal, over UHF channel 68, on February 17, 2009, the original target date in which full-power television stations in the United States were to transition from analog to digital broadcasts under federal mandate (which was later pushed forward to June 12, 2009). The station's digital signal continued to broadcasts on its pre-transition UHF channel 30. Through the use of PSIP, digital television receivers display the station's virtual channel as its former UHF analog channel 68, which was among the high band UHF channels (52-69) that were removed from broadcasting use as a result of the transition.

References

External links

Classic Arts Showcase affiliates
Eastern Florida State College
Television channels and stations established in 1987
EFS